Hunters of the Burning Stone was a 50th anniversary color comic strip based on the television series Doctor Who. It ran from issue 456 to 461 of Doctor Who Magazine, as well as in its own graphic novel publication. Written by Scott Gray, the story was essentially a direct sequel to the first Doctor Who episode, An Unearthly Child, not only featuring the return of Ian Chesterton and Barbara Wright as companions to the Eleventh Doctor, but also featuring the return of the tribe from the episode as the main villains of the story. The story featured extensive continuity to the show and to comics previously printed by the magazine, explaining the breaking of the TARDIS' Chameleon Circuit and setting up the creation of the Wonderland organization. The story was voted by fans in issue 479 as being the best comic of 2013.

Plot
The Doctor infiltrates a Sontaran timeship which is orbiting the planet Earth in the year 1965. Confronting the captain (Gol Clutha, an alien of another species whose crew took over the ship after filling it with gas poisonous to Sontarans) he is threatened by her with a Traulian mind-spike, which he has actually reconfigured to incapacitate her instead of killing her. Using Clutha's security pass, he is able to reach the ship's cargo, a large box formed with psi-responsive metal, holding something.

On the planet Cornucopia in the year 2013, a woman under the guise of "Miss Ghost" is over-seeing a space port that the planet now has been a base for. A ship run by a man by Pala has been delayed in take-off, and Pala demands to talk with her where the two fight and Pala is knocked unconscious. Searching the ship, Miss Ghost (in reality a disguised agent by the name of 'Cheshire') discovers a secret shipment of psi-responsive metal, and prepares to leave when her suit begins to fail and she only barely escapes being caught by the crew of the ship. As the ship takes off into trans-light mode by the orders of the now conscious Pala, it is attacked by a group of beings lit in fire who claim that the crew has stolen the burning stone, and begin attacking the ship in search for it.

The Doctor gains entrance to the metal cube by the use of his sonic screwdriver, where he discovers that inside the cube are Ian Chesterton and Barabra Wright, trapped in an illusion of Coal Hill School and their lives as teachers there. The Doctor attempts to free them of the illusion created by being inside the cube by questioning their thoughts on their student Susan Foreman, and questioning what would happen if they were to follow her home to investigate and what they would find. After drawing a police box on their chalk board, Ian and Barbara suddenly remember the events of their time on the TARDIS, and thus are able to be freed of the box's illusion.

Exiting back into the real world, the Doctor is at first excited to see the pair again, before he is shocked to learn that they do not know who he is (unaware of regeneration or the life that the Doctor had after them). As the crew of the ship begin to cut through the door, the Doctor leads Ian and Barbara through the ventilation shafts of the ship to where the TARDIS is. Ian and Barbara automatically begin calling for the Doctor from the outside the ship, believing that who they perceive to be the Doctor will be inside. They are shocked when the Eleventh Doctor leads them inside, where the interior has completely changed since they had last seen it.

The Doctor begins to explain that in his more recent travels he has continued to cross paths with psychic metal, in different important eras in human history. He collects some of the items which he has gathered in his travels together, including a gauntlet. Ian becomes convinced that the Doctor is nothing more than an imposter trying to fool the pair, and begins to argue with him over his identity. Barbara breaks the two apart, and the Doctor begins to set the TARDIS for Cornucopia, to which Ian notes that the real TARDIS would never be able to land in the right place or the right time.

On Pala's ship, the hulls are torn apart by the Hunters, who search for the "burning stone," in actuality the psychic metal. As they find and reach it, Cheshire detonates a fusion charge and destroys the crates. The Hunters, furious, destroy the ship as Cheshire escapes in a portal, leaving the crew to die.

The Doctor lands in Cornucopia, attempting to keep a low profile as there is evidently a bounty on the heads of Ian and Barbara. At that same moment, the Hunters return to the planet, where they learn that another piece of psychic metal, the Ziggurat of Cornucopia, had been destroyed long before their arrival. Furious, they begin to attack the marketplace, saying that they will make the world burn. Cheshire arrives and takes Barbara as a hostage through a portal. The Doctor confronts one of the Hunters and reveals that he was the one who destroyed the Ziggurat, at which point he is attacked but saved by Ian, who has accepted that he is the Doctor due to his moment of brave stupidity.

Escaping to a roof-top, the Doctor uses his sonic screwdriver to reveal the presence of an alien race known as the Prometheans, who reveal that they were behind the capture of Ian and Barbara. The Doctor realizes that they must have been behind the previous encounters which he had had with the metal, but before he can find further information from the beings he and Ian are saved by Horatio Lynk, a previous ally made by the Doctor on the planet. The three break into the home of Cheshire, where the Doctor discovers a doll owned by Annabel Lake, an innocent child he had encountered during a previous encounter with the metal. At the same time, Cheshire reveals to Barbara her true identity—an adult Annabel Lake. Patrick Lake, Annabel's father, enters the room and is confronted by the Doctor on what he has done to Annabel. Patrick explains that he has done what the Doctor told him to—to "make the leap."

At that moment, the four are knocked to the ground as the Promethians and Hunters force their way into the building. The Hunters approach Ian, who they have been hunting for along with the burning stone, and reveal that they wish for him to teach them more. Ian, confused, asks who they are, to which the fire on the beings is extinguished, revealing Za, Hur and Horg from the Tribe of Gum. The Za decrees that the three will take back the Earth.

The Promethians reveal that they had been watching Ian, Barbara, Susan, and the Doctor when they encountered the tribe the first time. They were fascinated by the encounter and introduction of developed culture, but disappointing when the team abandoned the tribe shortly into what they perceived to be an "experiment." The Promethians decided to continue it themselves, introducing the psychic metal to the tribe. This elevated them to gods on the Earth, where they began to control the other tribes and animals easily. However, they soon left the Earth in search of more metal, traveling in such a way that they crossed great leaps of time in what was short periods for them.

The Promethians lock into Patrick Lake's mind, where he is shown the events which led up to Annabel becoming a spy. After a failed Cyberman invasion in 2005 (seen in The Flood), Patrick began leading work into a new branch of MI6 dedicated to extraterrestrial investigation—to strike back against invasion forces before they arrive. Patrick trained his daughter to use a suit build from the remains of the Cyber-army built for the program. Realizing that the Promethians are pulling energy from Lake's mind, the Doctor shuts down his consciousness, causing the Promethians to instead focus their energy on his mind. To the Doctor's shock, he and Ian are transported to the Doctor's memory of the final day of the Last Great Time War on Gallifrey. Unwilling to let Ian see this horrible memory, he tries to fight the mind control of the Promethians, sending the pair into a whirlwind of twisted memories of enemies and aliens encountered by the Doctor.

The Doctor decides that he can not avoid coming to face to face with who he is anymore, and leads Ian through his memories. He watches over the early adventures which they shares, and recalls the moment where Ian stopped the Doctor from killing an injured tribesman so that they could escape. The Doctor reveals that as he continued to travel with Ian, he grew more and more fond of the pair, and decided to try and be more like them after they had left, taking more youthful companions and began to see the universe in a way much closer to the way that they had. Ian is amazed by the spectacles of heroism that is flashed before them as the Doctor recalls this, but the Doctor notes that there was also a dark side to this—recalling the many death which fell behind him, deaths which would lead to wars and more deaths. He recalls how we started the Time War inadvertently between his people and the Daleks, and how he had to end the war to save the universe. As Ian shows the Doctor all the good that he has done for the universe and all the lives that he has saved, the Doctor is finally able to accept himself for how the universe sees him and the pair escape the psychic realm.

The Doctor and Ian discover that the Promethian's ship is a neural reverser, built around the mental concept of the sun, which humanity has always identified as a powerful symbol. The craft will send down a psychic beam down to Earth, which will revert the entirety of humanity to neanderthals who will then be led by the Hunters. The Doctor, Ian, and Patrick are picked up by Annabel and Barbara on board Annabel's ship. There, the Doctor is unable to come up with a plan to stop the powerful Promethians. Encouraged by Ian, the Doctor suddenly comes up with a plan, as he quickly runs to the TARDIS.

The Doctor arrives in 1963, where he enters the Totter's Lane junkyard, where he finds his first incarnation's TARDIS. Entering, he confirms his identity to the ship, and apologises for what he is about to do. Returning to the Promethian's platform just as humanity is beginning to be affected by the neural reverser, the Doctor reveals that there is another symbol that appears over and over again through human history as a symbol of hope—the TARDIS, which appears in illustrations and history books throughout all of human history. Eventually, he reveals, that image inspires the design for the London police box. The Doctor uses the gauntlet gained in a previous encounter to change the shape of the Promethian's ship, from a sun to a police box. He reverses the effect of the reversal and locks the minds of the humans so that the plan could never succeed again.

The Promethians, furious over the collapse of their plans, order the Hunters to begin attacking the Doctor, who is electrocuted by the Hunter's spheres. Ian and Barbara enter the platform, and explain to the Hunters love and empathy, and how those are the basis of human emotions. They explain that the Doctor has protected the Earth because he cares for others other than himself, and how he has protected humanity. The Promethians, angered by this distraction, begin attacking Ian and Barbara. Angered that they have been treated by the Promethians, the Hunters turn on them and begin attacking them instead. Both sides are destroyed, the tribe understanding what they are fighting for and who they are for the first time.

On Earth, the Doctor attempts to shut down the M16 program started by Lake. There he is threatened by Hugo Wilding, who says that the organization would upload all the info that they had on the Doctor into known galaxy records if he attempted to intervene in any of their activities. Leaving peacefully, the Doctor learns that the organization's name is "Wonderland."

The Doctor attends Ian and Barbara's wedding as the best man. At the after party, the Doctor discusses with Barbara what he had done in 1963. He had destroyed the TARDIS' chameleon circuit, meaning that the TARDIS would always remain a police box and that it would become a symbol in human history. Barbara, bemused, notes that the TARDIS will always be where mischief lays.

Continuity 
The story reveals what happens to the tribe seen in An Unearthly Child after the First Doctor, Ian Chesterton, Barbara Wright, and Susan Foreman leave in the TARDIS. It also feature analysis of the Doctor's effects on the universe, featuring the Doctor being forced to relive crucial moments of his life with Ian by his side. These include the events of many Doctor Who stories.

References and notes

External links

Eleventh Doctor stories